Alexander Movsesi Atabekian (2 February 1868 – 4 December 1933) was a prominent Armenian anarchist, author and publisher of anarchist literature in Russian.

Biography 
Alexander Movsesi Atabekian was born on February 2, 1868, into an Armenian aristocratic (princely - melik) family of a doctor, in Shusha. Atabekian initially studied in a college in his native town, graduating in 1886, and then went on to study medicine at the University of Geneva (1889–96) and at Lyon. From 1888 to 1890, during his early years in Geneva, Atabekian participated in the Social Democrat Hunchakian Party, contributing to the typesetting of its periodical Hinchak (Sound of the Bell), which was published by Avetis Nazarbekian.

He left the party and became an anarchist in 1890 through reading Words of a Rebel, a series of essays written by Peter Kropotkin in 1879 for the paper Le Revolt later collected for publication in 1885 by Élisée Reclus. Thereafter he published Armenian and Russian translations of Kropotkin and other anarchist authors, and established relations with the militants and anarchists in the Armenian Revolutionary Federation. He also founded the Anarchist Library of Geneva.

His university studies impeded the publication of revolutionary propaganda, in 1893 the idea arose to transfer his printing equipment to the Free Russian Press in London, which printed and distributed literature that was banned in Russia - both revolutionary and liberal. Along with Bulgarian anarchist Paraskev Stoyanov, Atabekian met Kropotkin, who asked Atabekyan to keep his printing equipment, rather than give it to people whose views were very far from anarchism. The group instead used Atabekian's printing press to issue 4 brochures in Russian, including the beginning of Kropotkin's Words of a Rebel. In 1894 he edited Community, the only Armenian anarchist periodical, which ran for five issues.

After graduating from the university in 1896, Atabekyan settled in Bulgaria (as he was banned from entering Russia), and gradually abandoned political activities. Between 1896 and 1917 he worked as a doctor in Northern Persia; from 1914 to 1917 in the Imperial Russian Army as head of a field hospital on the Caucasian front. Upon the dissolution of the imperial army following the February Revolution, he again met Kropotkin and became an active anarchist in Moscow. He served as the editor of the anarchist periodical Pocin from 1919 to 1923, representing the anarcho-cooperative trend in the libertarian movement.

In October, as part of the Moscow Federation of Anarchist Groups, he participated in a discussion on the attitude of anarchists to specific actions of the Russian Provisional Government. In the article "Be consistent!" (Anarchy, October 16, 1917) Atabekian criticized the Socialist-Revolutionary members of the Moscow City Duma, who prevented the allocation of 60 million rubles to improve the situation of workers. In the essay "They want to spend!" (ibid., October 23) he expressed his approval of the planned strike of Moscow's workers.

On the eve of the October Revolution, he published an “Open Letter to P. A. Kropotkin”, in which he pointed out the aggressive nature of the war, not only from Germany and Austria-Hungary, but also from Russia; criticized Kropotkin for his “defencist” views, and called for the leadership of anarchists in the social revolution, which should protect workers from both the fierce class struggle and from “street Bolshevism”.

He viewed the October Revolution incredibly negatively. In the pamphlet "Bloody Week in Moscow" (Moscow, 1917) he described it as “a fratricidal massacre caused by strife between two different kinds of socialists” (p. 4). According to Atabekian, the reason for the October Revolution was the struggle between socialists and statesmen of different shades for power, for ministerial seats and other “warm places”. The brochure emphasized the indifference of the population of Moscow to the events. Touching on the first decrees of Soviet power, he pointed to their utopianism and impracticability. Subsequently, Atabekian constantly collaborated on the Anarchy newspaper, publishing in April–July 1918 more than 30 articles devoted to criticism of the actions of the Bolsheviks and the problems of the Russian anarchist movement.

In the spring of 1918, he organized the Pochin publishing house, which in its lifetime issued 24 brochures, as well as the Pochin magazine - which published a number of Kropotkin's letters. In 1920, he was arrested by the Cheka. In January–February 1921, he was at the bedside of the dying Kropotkin, in Dmitrov. Atabekian participated in the organization and work of the All-Russian Public Committee for the Perpetuation of the Memory of Kropotkin (VOK), and the creation of the Kropotkin Museum. After the closure of the Pochin Publishing House in 1922, he returned to the medical practice. On May 10, 1925, in Moscow, together with the majority of the members of the Anarchist Section of the VOK, he announced his withdrawal from the organization in protest against the persecution of anarchists in the USSR and the refusal of the VOK leadership to transfer the Kropotkin Museum to the exclusive responsibility of the anarchists.

Atabekian was arrested in the 1930s and is thought to have died in the gulag.

Works

(in Russian)
Возможна ли анархическая социальная революция?, М., 1918;
Вопросы теории и практики, М., 1918;
Против власти. Сборник статей, М., 1918.

References

External links
Ալեկսանդր Աթաբեկյան (in armenian)
Atabekian Articles from "Hamaynq" (in Armenian)

1868 births
1933 deaths
Writers from Shusha
Armenian anarchists
Soviet anarchists
Russian anarchists
Anarcho-communists
Armenian physicians
Armenian people from the Russian Empire
Soviet Armenians
Social Democrat Hunchakian Party politicians
Year of death unknown
Atabekian family